The Union for the Republic (UpR) was a centrist political party in Italy.

It was formed by Francesco Cossiga and his followers after the break-up of the Democratic Union for the Republic (UDR) in November 1999.

The UpR formed a short-lived centrist alliance called The Clover with the Italian Democratic Socialists (SDI) and Italian Republican Party (PRI), which was responsible for the fall of the D'Alema I Cabinet on 18 December. Consequently, the UpR did not enter in D'Alema II Cabinet.

Most of UpR members, with the notable exception of Carlo Scognamiglio, joined Forza Italia prior to the 2001 general election.

References

Defunct political parties in Italy
Centrist parties in Italy
Christian democratic parties in Italy
Catholic political parties
Political parties established in 1999
1999 establishments in Italy
2001 disestablishments in Italy
Political parties disestablished in 2001